George Griswold was a politician.

George Griswold may also refer to:

George Griswold House

See also